Nagaon BK is a small but prosperous village in Amalner Taluka, Jalgaon District, Maharashtra, India.

It is located on the bank of the river Chikhali, accommodating over 7,000 residents. It is surrounded by four small villages: Gadkhamb, Kachare, Dhupi and Manjardi. Nagaon BK has a community of diverse people, including Jadhav (Patil), Bodhare, Borse, and Bavas as well as some minorities like Bhillas. There are several locations near village which depict historical significance of the community.

Transportation and communication

Situated beside State Highway 14( 1 km away from Highway), Nagaon is well connected to Amalner and Chopda.  It is approx 70 km away from Jalgaon District place. There is Autorickshaw (Tum-Tum) available from Amalner(Taluka Place) to reach Nagaon which is hardly 20 mins.distance from Amalner.

Sharing 6-seaters and autos are an easily available, which take customers right to the gate of Nagaon or to the house they want to visit.

The nearest post office to Nagaon is in Amalner; however, Nagaon does have a sub post office to serve the locals for their daily routines. Nagaon's postal code is 425401, while 02587 and +912587 are its STD and ISD codes respectively. It has great cell and Internet connectivity from countries all major network operators, thus you are all always connected to the world.

Occupations and key activities

The dominant occupation in the village is farming. The area is bestowed with rich black soil and uses advanced irrigation techniques. Cotton, wheat, groundnuts, jowar, bajra, dadar and vegetables are the main crop products of the village.  Given good transport facilities, products are traded in markets such as Amalner, Chopda, Dharangaon and Jalgaon.  Many farmers are actively involved in finding new and convenient techniques of farming.

Other people have opted for professions such as dairy farming or operation of restaurants, retail stores, garages, etc.

Over more than 100 young people from the village are serving in state and central defence forces. It is the only village in the district to have this many soldiers and police in service. Over 50 engineers from Nagaon are associated with organizations in diverse fields such as mechanical, chemical, IT/software, hospitality and management. And some of them at a Higher Managerial Position in big Corporate,Technology organizations in the Metro cities of India.  Many residents have been abroad on work-related trips to countries like USA, Germany, Singapore, Oman, Qatar, Thailand, Ghana and Dubai. Few individuals have excelled in academics by acquiring PH.Ds in relevant subjects.

Cultural activities 
Cultural and communal activities are a core attribute of Nagaon.

Shiv Jayanti, Ganesh Chaturthi, Navratri, Hanuman Jayanti, Ram Navami, Makar Sankranti, Gudhi Padwa, Akshay Tritiya (Akhaji), Pola, Dasra, Holi, and Diwali are the main festivals celebrated together in Nagaon.

During the Makar Sankranti and Dasra celebrations, people pay respect to each other and do Pranam to elders, while distributing sweets (Til Gul) and gold (Aptyachi Pane).

Navratri and Ganesh Chaturthi in Nagaon are the festivals to watch and wait for. During Navratri people leave their daily chores and actively engage in the 9-day celebration and worship of the Goddess Indasani (believed to be a sibling of Saptashrungi).

Specially on Diwali holiday's the people's who are working outside the village get together with their families at Native Nagaon.They spend 3-4 days with their families.

Languages
Even though Marathi is the official state language, Ahirani is a widely spoken and accepted language in and around the village.

Education
The following schools are attended by local students:

 Primary School: Zilha parishad prathmik shala, Nagaon BK
 Higher Secondary School and College: Madyamik & Uccha Madyamik Vidyalay Nagaon-Gadkhamb
 Bahuddeshiya Aashram School of Nagaon Gadkhamb
 Pratap College in Amalner is the nearest science, arts and commerce college.

Temples and key locations
 Indasani Mata
 Ram Temple
 Mari Mata
 Mahadev (Shiv)
 Sai Baba
 Hanuman
Guru Maharaj

Villages in Jalgaon district